Redpath Peaks is a cluster of low, snow-covered peaks lying 3 nautical miles (6 km) southeast of Mount Shattuck and the Independence Hills, at the south extremity of the Heritage Range, Ellsworth Mountains. They were named by the Advisory Committee on Antarctic Names (US-ACAN) for Bruce B. Redpath, a United States Antarctic Research Program (USARP) geophysicist on the South Pole—Queen Maud Land Traverse I of 1964–65.

See also
 Mountains in Antarctica

References

 

Ellsworth Mountains
Mountains of Ellsworth Land